Aire is the eighth album by Mexican pop singer Yuri. It was released on November 22, 1987. It sold more than 700000 copies earning a Platinum disc . She started the Aire Tour, sponsored by Coca-Cola.

It reached #8 in Latin Pop Albums in Billboard .

Track listing

Production
 Executive producer: Miguel Blasco
 Art Director: Miguel Blasco
 Director: Gian Pietro Felisatti
 Musical arrangements: Gian Pietro Felisatti, Loris Ceroni and Santa-Noé
 Recording Studio: Eurosonic (Madrid) / Baby Studios (Milan) / CRS (Bologna)
 Sound engineer: José Antonio Alvarez Alija
 Additional engineer: Massimo Noé, Loris Ceroni
 Mixed at: Estudios Torres Sonido
 Photography: Antonio Parra
 Graphic design: ZEN
 Stylist: Manolo Batista

Singles
 "Qué te pasa"
 "Cuando baja la marea"
 "Amores Clandestinos"

Single Charts

1987 albums
Yuri (Mexican singer) albums